Crossidius discoideus is a species of beetle in the family Cerambycidae. It was described by say in 1824.

References

Trachyderini
Beetles described in 1824